Passenger Pigeons is a 2010 mumblecore drama film written and directed by filmmaker Martha Stephens and her feature film debut.

Synopsis 
Four different stories intersect after a miner dies in an accident in an East Kentucky coalmine. The brother of the dead miner, Moses (Bryan Marshall) comes home to visit his family for the first time in years. When the mine closes temporarily, Jesse (Kentucker Audley) spends the time off with his girlfriend Elva (Caroline White). Buck (Earl Lynn Nelson) is an executive with the mining company who comes to town to investigate the mine's safety. Buck is soon to retire and uses the trip to show his replacement Nolan (Brendan McFadden) the ropes.  Annie (Karrie Crouse), an activist from Washington D.C., uses the incident as means to drum up support against surface mining.

Release 
Passenger Pigeons premiered at the South by Southwest Film Festival on March 13, 2010 and was released on DVD October 15, 2013.

References

 http://www.indiewire.com/article/passenger_pigeons_director_martha_stephens_i_put_every_piece_of_myself_into
 http://www.efilmcritic.com/feature.php?feature=2965
 The New York Times Movies
 http://filmmakermagazine.com/70328-martha-stephens-on-pilgrim-song/#.VgjPdfRp5c4

External links

2010 films
2010 independent films
Films set in Kentucky
American independent films
2010 drama films
2010s English-language films
2010s American films